Megachile plesiosoma is a species of bee in the family Megachilidae. It was described by Theodore Dru Alison Cockerell in 1935.

References

Plesiostoma
Insects described in 1935